Capoeta sieboldii,  also called the nipple-lip scraper, is a cyprinid fish species from Turkey. It is widespread and lives in a range of habitats that are at least seasonally connected to rivers or streams. The distribution is from the Sakarya River eastwards, to western Transcaucasia.

References 

sieboldii
Fish described in 1864